Lemuel Ely Quigg (February 12, 1863 – July 1, 1919) was a United States representative from New York.

Biography
He was born near Chestertown, Kent County, Maryland to a Methodist minister. He attended the public schools of Wilmington, Delaware.  He moved to New York City in 1880 and engaged in journalism. He was the editor of the Flushing (N.Y.) Times in 1883 and 1884. He was a member of the editorial staff of the New York Tribune from 1884 to 1894. He served as the editor-in-chief of the New York Press in 1895.

Quigg was elected as a Republican to the Fifty-third Congress to fill the vacancy caused by the resignation of John R. Fellows. He was re-elected to the Fifty-fourth and Fifty-fifth Congresses and served from January 30, 1894, to March 3, 1899.  He served as chairman of the Committee on Expenditures in the Department of State (Fifty-fourth and Fifty-fifth Congresses). He was an unsuccessful candidate for re-election in 1898 to the Fifty-sixth Congress, losing to New York millionaire William A. Chanler.

He was chairman of the Republican State conventions in 1896 and 1902 and a delegate to the Republican National Convention in 1896, 1900, and 1904. He was the president of the Republican county committee 1896–1900.  He was a delegate to the State constitutional convention in 1915.

After leaving Congress, he studied law and was admitted to the bar in 1903. He engaged in the practice of law in New York City until his death there in 1919 after a three-month bout with Bright's disease. Survived by his wife Ethel G. (Murray), son Murray Townsend Quigg, brothers Rev. Howard and A.W., and two sisters, he was buried in Flushing Cemetery, Flushing, Queens County, New York.

References

"Lemuel Ely Quigg, Long Ill, Dies at 56", The New York Times, July 3, 1919, p. 12.

External links
 
 

1863 births
1919 deaths
Burials at Flushing Cemetery
Editors of New York City newspapers
New-York Tribune personnel
People from Kent County, Maryland
Republican Party members of the United States House of Representatives from New York (state)
19th-century American politicians
Journalists from New York City